Ellsworthia is a genus of mites in the family Laelapidae.

Species
 Ellsworthia americanus Ewing, 1933
 Ellsworthia imphalensis (Radford, 1947)

References

Laelapidae